Mahlberg is a town in the county of Ortenaukreis, Baden-Württemberg, Germany.

Mahlberg may also refer to:

Places
 Mahlberg (mountain) (612.5 m), a mountain in the Northern Black Forest, Baden-Württemberg, Germany
 , part of the town of Bad Münstereifel, North Rhine-Westphalia

 Mahlberg (Westerwald) (Malberg) (360 m), hill in the Lower Westerwald, Rhineland-Palatinate, Germany
 Mahlberg (Harz) (476.8 m), hill in the Harz Mountains, Saxony-Anhalt, Germany

Surname
 Greg Mahlberg (born 1952), American baseball player and manager
  (born 1949), German author
  (born 1965), German politician (CDU)
  (1884–1935), German economist

See also
 Malberg (disambiguation)